The Ontario Automobile Policy (OAP 1, also called the Owner's Policy) is a regulation under the Ontario Insurance Act enacted by the Parliament of Ontario to cover financial damages to persons and property after a car crash. All private companies registered to sell auto insurance in Ontario, are required to use the OAP for their private car insurance policy. The OAP is the legal contract that connects an Ontario driver with every Ontario based insurance company.

Insurance coverage is divided up between several different portions of the policy. The circumstances of the accident determine which section is used. An often misunderstood one is the Direct Compensation Property Damage (DCPD). The OAP is a "No Fault" insurance rules for accidents within the province. DCPD is mandatory to purchase, and it says insured drivers claim through their own insurance companies for repairs, rental, and tow charges, even when they are not at fault for an accident. If the at fault driver in Ontario doesn't have DCPD, then a driver is covered by Uninsured Motorist Property Damage instead (UMPD). UMPD is also mandatory to buy.

Other sections of the policy are Specified Perils and Comprehensive, which insure events like hail, theft, and vandalism. Collision covers damages from at-fault accidents and hit and runs. All Perils combines Comprehensive and Collision but adds some coverage. Each is optional to buy, however lease and car loan companies usually require Collision and Comprehensive.

The Ontario Automobile Policy does have several extra insurance pages called Endorsements. These are optional to buy. The most common are rental insurance (Loss of Use) used for Collision and Comprehensive claims, and new parts/new vehicle replacement (43 Endorsement).

In Ontario accident fault is judged according to the Ontario Fault Determination Rules. Which means whether an auto claim is covered by DPCD, or Collision, or a mixture of both, depends on how the insurance adjuster evaluates a driver's fault rating after an accident.

Needed For Insurance Coverage 

Every insurance section of the OAP has requirements that need to be met before a claim can be made under that section.

What is covered 

Each section of the OAP coverage certain events like car crashes, vandalism, and hit and runs. Below is a summary.

What is not covered 

Each section of the OAP coverage does not cover certain events like car crashes, vandalism, and hit and runs. Below is a summary.

Deductibles 

Insurance claims often come with deductibles. Either it is a percentage of the deductible purchased (100% of a $1,000.00 collision deductible) or a standard dollar deductible. Below is a summary.

* DCPD deductibles are rarely purchased, but if done, the DCPD deductible applies for not at fault accidents.

Disputes 

Insurance company adjusters are responsible for getting accident details and interpreting the OAP. Insurance adjusters determine what accidents will be covered under what section. However, policyholders may dispute an adjusters determination by a process of appeal. Each insurance company has a difference process. The insurance representative (adjuster, broker, or agent) is responsible for advising policyholders of the procedures.

Also, each insurance company has a Complaint Officer. A list of officers is available here or by contacting the Financial Services Commission of Ontario directly. Alternatively, the complaint can be sent to the Chief Executive Officer directly. If a policyholder and insurance company do not come to an agreement, the insurance company is obligated to send a "final position letter" outlining their reasons as well as providing a policyholder with the name and details of an independent Ombudsman organization who reviews all complaints. Upon receipt of an unresolved complaint with applicable paperwork and final position letter, a Complaint Officer at the independent Ombudsman organization will review and respond to all complaints.

FSCO also has a dispute resolution service available as well.

References 

Ontario law